The inauguration of Ferdinand E. Marcos as the tenth president of the Philippines took place on December 30, 1969, at the Quirino Grandstand in Manila. The inauguration marked the commencement of the second four-year term of Ferdinand Marcos as president and the third term of Fernando Lopez as Vice President. The oath of office was administered by Chief Justice of the Supreme Court of the Philippines Roberto Concepcion.

Presidency of Ferdinand Marcos
Marcos 2
1969 in the Philippines